The 1934 Volta a Catalunya was the 16th edition of the Volta a Catalunya cycle race and was held from 16 June to 24 June 1934. The race started and finished in Barcelona. The race was won by Bernardo Rogora.

Route and stages

General classification

References

1934
Volta
1934 in Spanish road cycling
June 1934 sports events